Mary Chinery-Hesse, née Blay (born 29 October 1938) is an international civil servant and diplomat serving as the first woman Chancellor of the University of Ghana, inducted on 1 August 2018. She was the first female Deputy Director-General of the International Labour Organization

Early life and education
Mary Blay was born to Robert Samuel Blay, a barrister, jurist and a Justice of the Supreme Court of Ghana during the First Republic. Her mother was Dinah Blay. She had her secondary education at the Wesley Girls' Senior High School in Cape Coast. She also holds a BA (Hons) in Sociology and Economics, and Doctor of Laws (honoris causa) from the University of Ghana and did postgraduate training in Development Economics at the University of Dublin.

Career
In her early career, Mary Chinery-Hesse was a Principal Secretary at the Ministry of Finance and Economic Planning, and Secretary of the National Economic Planning Council. She joined the UN in 1981 where she held the appointment of the first African Woman Resident Coordinator of the United Nations System and Resident Representative of UNDP to many countries including, Sierra Leone, Tanzania, the Seychelles, and Uganda. She headed the Consultative Committee on Programme and Operational Questions (CCPOQ) of the United Nations from 1993 to 1998, the Commonwealth Expert Group of Eminent Persons on Structural Adjustment and Women and was instrumental in the published report, Engendering Adjustment. She belonged to the Council of African Advisers of the World Bank between 1992 and 1998. In the 1990s, she chaired the High-Level Panel of Eminent Persons on Review of Progress in the Implementation of the Programme for the Least Developed Countries. She was a member of the Eminent Persons’ Advisory Panel of the African Union and served on the Zedillo Commission, more formally known as the Distinguished High-Level Panel of Eminent Persons on Financing for Development.

In 1989, she was appointed as the first woman Deputy Director-General of the International Labour Organization in Geneva, Switzerland. She served as an advisor to John Kufour, the former President of Ghana. She was the Vice-Chairman of the National Development Planning Commission.

She has served on several boards including those at the Centre for Policy Analysis and the Voluntary Fund for Technical Cooperation-UN High Commissioner for Human Rights. She was also a Commissioner at the Public Utilities Regulatory Commission and at the Commission on HIV/AIDS and Governance in Africa.

She was appointed as the Chancellor of the University of Ghana. She assumed this position on 1 August 2018, and succeeded Kofi Annan, former UN Secretary-General.

Chinery-Hesse Committee
She was commissioned by the erstwhile government of former President John Kufour to determine the end of service benefits/emoluments of Article 71 officer holders.

Personal life 
She was married to Lebrecht James Chinery-Hesse (1930-2018), a Ghanaian lawyer and a former principal state attorney who had done international stints in Sierra Leone, Zambia and Uganda, and was awarded the Grand Medal by the Ghanaian government. Their son, Herman Chinery-Hesse is a software entrepreneur.

Works 

 Chinnery-Hesse, Mary et al. (1989) "Engendering adjustment for the 1990s : report of a Commonwealth expert group on women and structural adjustment" London: Commonwealth Secretariat

Legacy
From 2010 to 2013, she was a member of the Panel of the Wise, a consultative body of the African Union for West Africa and the Board Chairman for Zenith Bank, Ghana.

Awards and recognition
Chinery-Hesse received the highest national award of Ghana the Order of the Star of Ghana under the John Kufour's administration. She was also awarded the Gusi Peace Prize for International Diplomacy and Humanitarianism in Manila, Philippines, on 24 November 2010. In November 2021, she was awarded an honorary doctorate  by the University of London for her contributions to public service.

References

Living people
Akan people
Ghanaian civil servants
Ghanaian Protestants
People from Accra
University of Ghana alumni
Alumni of Trinity College Dublin
People educated at Wesley Girls' Senior High School
Ghanaian Methodists
1938 births
Ghanaian presidential advisors
International Labour Organization people
Fellows of the African Academy of Sciences
Honorary Fellows of the African Academy of Sciences